was a women's football team from Hiratsuka which played in Division 1 of Japan's Nadeshiko League. It founded the league back in 1989. The club was disbanded in 1999.

History
The club was acquired in 1990 by Fujita Industries, parent company of the team that became Shonan Bellmare. The women's team was run directly by the company. In 1999, following the withdrawal of Fujita's support of the Bellmare club, the women's team was disbanded.

Honors

Domestic competitions
Empress's Cup All-Japan Women's Football Tournament
Champions (1) : 1995/96

Results

Transition of team name
Fujita Tendai SC Mercury : 1990 - 1994
Fujita SC Mercury : 1995 - 1999

References

External links 

Japanese women's club teams

Women's football clubs in Japan
1976 establishments in Japan
Shonan Bellmare
Sports teams in Kanagawa Prefecture
Hiratsuka, Kanagawa